"Sonne" (German for "Sun") is a song by German Neue Deutsche Härte band Rammstein. It was released in February 2001, as the first single from their album Mutter. According to Till Lindemann, the song was originally written as an entrance song for the boxer Vitali Klitschko, whose surname was also the working title of the song. The female vocal comes from Spectrasonic's "Symphony of Voices" sample library.
The music video for the band's 2019 single "Deutschland" features a piano-based version of "Sonne" in the ending credits.

Music video
The video features the band as dwarves mining gold for Snow White. According to Paul Landers in the Making of Sonne, the idea came from a video made by Oliver Riedel, who mixed the song with parts of Snow White. Snow White is played by Russian soap actress Yulia Stepanova.

Live performances

The song debuted as "Klitschko" on 16 April 2000. It was very different from the final version released in Mutter. It was played in some concerts on the Japanese/Australia-New Zealand leg of the Sehnsucht tour, before Mutter was released and its tour started. These concerts were the only time the third verse of the song was played; when played live, the band usually omits the final stanza, and instead plays a slightly longer intro and outro.

Track listing

The single is also available as a 2-track CD, featuring "Sonne" and "Adios".

Charts

Weekly charts

Year-end charts

Certifications

References

2000 songs
2001 singles
Rammstein songs
Songs written by Christian Lorenz
Songs written by Christoph Schneider
Songs written by Oliver Riedel
Songs written by Paul Landers
Songs written by Richard Z. Kruspe
Songs written by Till Lindemann
Works based on Snow White